Cristóbal Machín Fernández de la Puente (born 11 November 1957), commonly known as Balín, is a retired Spanish footballer who played as a forward.

Career statistics

Club

Notes

References

1957 births
Living people
Spanish footballers
Association football forwards
Real Madrid CF players
Real Madrid Castilla footballers
CA Osasuna players
UD Salamanca players
Segunda División players
La Liga players